Suryam is a 2004 Indian Telugu-language action drama film directed by Samudra and starring Manchu Vishnu, Hindi actress Celina Jaitly, and Veda. The film was produced by Vishnu's father Mohan Babu under his banner Sri Lakshmi Prasanna Pictures. Mohan Babu had previously produced Vishnu's first film, Vishnu (2003).

Cast 

Manchu Vishnu as Suryam
Celina Jaitly as Madhulatha
 Veda as Swati 
 Srinath as Amar
 Mukesh Rishi as Madhulatha's father
 Jhansi as Suryam's mother
 Sunil as Gaali Seenu
 Kota Srinivasa Rao as Police Officer 
 Giri Babu
Vinaya Prasad
Brahmanandam as Pujari (Priest)
Babu Mohan
Ali
Ananth
Venu Madhav
Raghu Babu
Subbaraju as Badhram
Kondavalasa
Rajesh
Alapati Lakshmi
Ponnambalam 
Padma Jayanthi
Besant Ravi
Mohan Babu in a special appearance

Soundtrack 
The audio function was held in Taj Krishna  on 14 November 2004. Dasari Narayana Rao attended the function as the chief guest.

Release 
Idlebrain gave the film a rating of two-and-three-quarters out of four and wrote that "The director gave more preference to put as many slots as possible for stunts in the film instead of concentrating on narrating the story". Full Hyderabad wrote that "The only way you'd be able to sit through all of Suryam is if someone held a gun to your head. And pulled the trigger".

References

External links 

2000s Telugu-language films
2004 action drama films
 Indian action drama films
2004 films
Films scored by Chakri